Marshalltown may refer to:

Marshalltown, Iowa, United States 
Marshalltown, Virginia, United States 
Marshalltown, Nova Scotia, Canada 
Marshalltown, Johannesburg, South Africa
the former name of Marshall, Victoria, a suburb of Geelong, Australia

See also
Marshallstown, County Down, a townland in County Down, Northern Ireland